New Covenant Christian School may refer to:
New Covenant Christian School (Maryland)
New Covenant Christian School (Lansing, Michigan)